Abu 'Abdallah Muhammad (killed 995) was the last ruler of the Afrighid dynasty of Khwarezm from 967 to 995. He was the son and successor of Abu Sa'id Ahmad.

During the chaos that occurred among the Samanids, Khwarazm was not affected by it. However, in 992, Abu 'Abdallah aided the Samanid ruler Nuh II against the Turkic Kara-Khanid Khanate, and was granted several towns in northern Khurasan, which included the important town of Abiward. Abu 'Ali Simjuri, the governor of Khurasan, however, refused to grant the latter the cities.

In 995, Ma'mun I ibn Muhammad, the Ma'munid ruler of Gurganj, invaded the domains of Abu 'Abdallah and executed him, putting an end to Afrighid rule, and uniting the Khwarezm province under his rule.

References
 
 

995 deaths
Year of birth unknown
10th-century Iranian people
Afrighids